SS Balto was a Norwegian steamship that was seized by the German Submarine  on 6 November 1916 in the Bay of Biscay, and briefly used as a depot ship.

The  cargo ship had been built in Greenock, Scotland in 1902 as Himera for Canadian owners and sold to Norway in 1914.

Construction 
The Balto was built as Himera by Russell & Co. Ltd. in Greenock, Scotland, United Kingdom, as the last of 16 vessels they had built for Canadian owner, William Thomson & Company of Saint John, New Brunswick for their general cargo trades. She was launched on 11 August 1902 and sailed on 29 August for Saint John after her sea trial. She was measured  and carried  of cargo. Her propulsion was a screw propeller, powered by a 3-cylinder triple expansion engine of 298 nhp and 1,800 ihp made by John G. Kincaid & Company of Greenock.

Merchant service
Himera was registered at Liverpool, England, to the Steamship 'Himera' Company Ltd. of Rothesay, New Brunswick, Canada under the management of William Thomson & Company, and allocated Official Number 115313. She sailed from Greenock for Saint John on 29 August 1902, after sea trials, to enter Thomson's general cargo trades. In 1907 the ship was re-registered at the port of Sant John, New Brunswick.
In 1914, Himera was sold to the Norwegian company D/S A/S Balto, under the management of B Stolt-Nielsen & Sønner A/S of Haugesund and renamed Balto.

Sinking 
Balto was on a voyage from New York and Bilbao, Spain, to Lisbon, Portugal, and Cadiz, Spain with general cargo. On 6 November 1916 she was stopped by the German submarine  in the Gulf of Biscay and was forced to follow U-49 as a depot ship; Captain Johnsen was taken prisoner aboard the submarine, along with other captured ships' masters.

Soon Balto would meet the same fate as at 8:00 am on 9 November her crew as well as the 109 prisoners from Columbian were ordered to abandon the ship and instead board the Swedish cargo ship SS Väring which had been assigned the same role as Balto before her. As the food supplies onboard Väring were dwindling, the captured crews were brought near the coast and released in the ship's boats. They reached A Coruña, Spain, on 14 November 1916.

References

1902 ships
Ships built on the River Clyde
World War I shipwrecks in the Atlantic Ocean
Scuttled vessels
Cargo ships of the United Kingdom
Steamships of Norway
Steamships of Canada
Ships sunk by German submarines in World War I
Ships sunk with no fatalities
Maritime incidents in 1916